The ARIA Music Award for Best Female Artist, is an award presented at the annual ARIA Music Awards, which recognises "the many achievements of Aussie artists across all music genres", since 1987. It is handed out by the Australian Recording Industry Association (ARIA), an organisation whose aim is "to advance the interests of the Australian record industry."

To be eligible, the female artist must meet one of the following criteria: be an Australian citizen; be born in Australia; be a permanent resident or have applied for permanent residency (having lived in Australia for at least six months for two consecutive years prior to the awards and signed to an Australian record label in the case of an applicant); if they are from New Zealand they must have lived in Australia for at least six months for two consecutive years prior to the awards and signed to an Australian record label.

The ARIA Award for Best Female Artist is given to a female artist who have had a single or an album appear in the ARIA Top 100 Singles Chart between the eligibility period, and is voted for by a judging academy, which consists of 1000 members from different areas of the music industry.

The award for Best Female Artist was first presented to Jenny Morris in 1987. Wendy Matthews, Sia and Kasey Chambers hold the record for the most wins, with three each, followed by Morris, Kate Ceberano, Natalie Imbruglia, Missy Higgins and Kimbra with two. Kylie Minogue has received 14 nominations, more than any other artist, winning one in 2001 for her album Light Years (2000).

This, and the ARIA Award for Best Male Artist was merged in 2021 to form a single award for ARIA Award for Best Artist.This change is designed to ensure that the ARIA Awards reflect and embrace equality and the true diversity of the music industry in 2021. In making this change the number of nominees for Best Artist will be ten.

Winners and nominees
In the following table: the years in the "Year" column are listed as per the ARIA Award ceremony; in the "Winner" column the winner for that particular year is always listed first and highlighted in a separate colour, in bold face and with a double dagger; the nominees are placed alphabetically beneath the winner and are not highlighted or in bold face; the "Album/single title" column lists the title of the album or single that the artist was nominated for (no reliable sources lists the works that Kate Ceberano, Sharon O'Neill and Shona Laing were nominated for in 1988).

Multiple wins and nominations

The following individuals received two or more Best Female Artist awards:

The following individuals received two or more Best Female Artist nominations:

See also

 List of music awards honoring women

References

External links

F
Music awards honoring women